Lamberville may refer to the following places in France:

Lamberville, Manche, in the Manche département 
Lamberville, Seine-Maritime, in the Seine-Maritime département

See also
Lambertville (disambiguation)